DelCampo School (DCS) is a private school located in the region of Tegucigalpa, Honduras. DCS is also a college preparatory school with English and Spanish as the primary languages of instruction. The program of study offers students the opportunity to graduate with an American high school diploma as well as the "Bachillerato" degree, which fulfills requirements of the Honduran Ministry of Education.

It has purchased an artificial turf pitch from Xtreme Turf, manufactured and installed by ACT Global Sports. The benefits of the synthetic grass system for sports field turf include more recreational and playing hours, reduced maintenance and long-term performance.

DelCampo provides special education services through a Learning Resource Center. The center offers five service programs ranging from inclusion to homebound instruction.

DelCampo School has entered into the field of adult and continuing education. This program is geared toward providing educational services to members of the community at large. The early evening and weekend class times fit conveniently into the schedules of working adults. English as a Second Language and the Bachiller en Ciencias y Letras por Madurez (equivalent to U.S. GED) are examples of some of the course offerings.

The College Counseling office has developed relationships with university admissions offices throughout the United States. These relationships have translated into millions of dollars of scholarship money for DelCampo students.

Accreditation
 SACS CASI - Southern Association of Colleges & Schools Council on Accreditation & School Improvement

School Membership
 OACAC (Overseas Association for College Admission Counselors)
 FENIEPH (Federación Nacional de Instituciones Educativas de Honduras)
 ABSH (Association of Bilingual Schools of Honduras)
 AASCA (The Association of American Schools of Central America)
 NHS (National Honor Society)
 Ministry of Education

External links
 Official website

International schools in Honduras
Schools in Tegucigalpa